The 2007 HSBC World Match Play Championship was the 44th HSBC World Match Play Championship played and the 4th time played as an official European Tour event. It was from 11 October to 14 October at The Wentworth Club. The champion received €1,443,830 (£1,000,000 or $2,042,513.20) making it the biggest first prize in golf. Each match was played over 36 holes. Ernie Els defeated Ángel Cabrera 6&4 in the final to win the tournament for the 7th time.

Qualification
1. Defending champion: Paul Casey
2. World #1 from the Official World Golf Rankings as of 1 January 2007: Tiger Woods (declined invitation)
3. The leading 10 available players from the "HSBC Major Tournaments Ranking" at the end of the 2007 PGA Championship on 13 August 2007: Pádraig Harrington (2), Ángel Cabrera (4), Ernie Els (6), Woody Austin (T7), Justin Rose (9), Retief Goosen (10)
Zach Johnson (3), Jim Furyk (5) and Sergio García (T7) declined their invitations so the invitations went to the next three players in the rankings who are: Rory Sabbatini (11), Jerry Kelly (12), Andrés Romero (13)
Number in parenthesis in the player's HSBC Major Tournaments Ranking
4. The leading two available European Tour members: Anders Hansen, Niclas Fasth

*Note: These categories are listed in order. If you qualify for a high category then you are not listed under a lower category.
Source

Course

Bracket

Championship match

 Ernie Els

 Ángel Cabrera

Red background for birdies.
Blue background for bogeys.

Prize money breakdown

Actual prize fund

Breakdown for European Tour Order of Merit

Source
Source for $US Dollar conversions

References

External links
Coverage on the European Tour's official site
Wentworth Club official site

Volvo World Match Play Championship
Golf tournaments in England
HSBC World Match Play Championship
HSBC World Match Play Championship
HSBC World Match Play Championship